Sidney Bowcott (1881 in Worcester, England - March 20, 1963)

Bowcott immigrated to Canada in 1905, and then moved to Edmonton in 1907. He spent 9 years on the Edmonton Public School Board, and then spent 10 years on the Edmonton council. He was president of the Montgomery Legion of the Royal Canadian Legion for a time as well. After his time on council, he was an unsuccessful candidate in the Alberta Provincial election. He was married and had one daughter.

References

1881 births
1963 deaths
Edmonton city councillors
British emigrants to Canada